Anthony Dean Roper (December 13, 1964 – October 14, 2000) was an American professional stock car racing driver. A competitor in the NASCAR Craftsman Truck Series, he died after suffering injuries in a racing accident at Texas Motor Speedway.

Early career
Roper was born in Springfield, Missouri, to Dean Roper and Shirley Medley. Growing up his family was heavily involved in auto racing, as his father was a noted competitor in ARCA and other stock car racing series.  Roper started racing in 1986.  For the next six years he raced in IMCA Modifieds and late models on Midwest dirt and asphalt tracks. In 1992 he finished in second place for the American Speed Association Rookie of the Year Award. He started racing in the NASCAR Craftsman Truck Series in 1995, and the Busch Series in 1999.

Death

At the Craftsman Truck Series O'Reilly 400 at Texas Motor Speedway on October 13, 2000, Roper was involved in an accident when he attempted to pass Steve Grissom and Rick Ware. Roper's Ford made contact with Grissom's front bumper causing it to take a sudden hard-right turn, which then caused the truck to impact the concrete wall of the tri-oval. An unconscious, unresponsive Roper was extricated from his truck, taken to the infield care center at TMS, and subsequently airlifted to Dallas's Parkland Memorial Hospital. Roper was determined to have a severe neck injury which prevented the flow of blood to his brain. He was put on a ventilator, and succumbed to the injury the day after the race, aged 35.

Roper was the third NASCAR driver to perish from racing related injuries in 2000, the first two being Adam Petty and Kenny Irwin Jr., respectively. It was the second fatality in the Craftsman Truck Series, the first being that of John Nemechek in 1997. Roper's was the first racing fatality recorded at Texas Motor Speedway.

A funeral service for Roper was held at the Fair Grove High School gymnasium, where he graduated from. More than 600 people attended.  

Tony's father, Dean Roper, died in a crash just a year later (his death was caused by a heart attack, not the crash itself), on August 19, 2001. Both Tony and his father Dean died in racing accidents within 10 months of each other.

Legacy 
The Tony Roper Scholarship Fund was founded after Roper's death. As of now, it is still running to this day.

Roper's death would be one of 5 deaths within the span of two years that would lead NASCAR to implement and mandate the HANS device in every single car and driver.

Motorsports career results

NASCAR
(key) (Bold – Pole position awarded by qualifying time. Italics – Pole position earned by points standings or practice time. * – Most laps led.)

Busch Series

Craftsman Truck Series

References

External links
 
 

1964 births
2000 deaths
Sportspeople from Springfield, Missouri
Racing drivers from Missouri
NASCAR drivers
American Speed Association drivers
Racing drivers who died while racing
Sports deaths in Texas
Filmed deaths in motorsport
Burials in Missouri